Kamrup Sanskrit Sanjivani Sabha is a research and preservation institution formed in 1930's, which deals primarily in Sanskrit language topics. It is located in Nalbari in India, and throughout involved in preservation of rare Sanskrit manuscripts. The manuscript library of this institute contains more than thousand Sanskrit manuscripts.

See also
Kamarupa Anusandhan Samiti

References

Sanskrit universities in India
Research institutes in Assam
Culture of Assam
Nalbari
1931 establishments in British India
Organizations established in 1931
Education in Nalbari district